Caligari Corporation was founded in 1985 by Roman Ormandy. A prototype 3D video animation package for the Amiga Computer, which led to the incorporation of Octree Software was released in 1986. From 1988 to 1992, Octree released several software packages including Caligari1, Caligari2, Caligari Broadcast, and Caligari 24. Caligari wanted to provide inexpensive yet professional industrial video and corporate presentation software. In 1993, Octree Software moved from New York to California and became known as Caligari Corporation. In 1994 trueSpace 1.0 was introduced on the Windows platform. In early 2008, the company was acquired by Microsoft.

On 21 May 2009, Caligari announced that Microsoft would cease to provide support for Caligari trueSpace. The website and forums were affected, and some services ceased to operate from May 22, 2009.

External links

 Caligari Corporation's official website last Wayback archive
 Fan Site developing trueSpace software since 2009

American companies established in 1985
American companies disestablished in 2009
Software companies established in 1985
Software companies disestablished in 2009
Software companies based in Washington (state)
Companies based in New York (state)
Companies based in Mountain View, California
Amiga raytracers
Defunct software companies of the United States
Microsoft acquisitions